Infoware is a term that was coined by Tim O'Reilly and is defined as a website that use commoditized server software such as LAMP to enable data (e.g. book comments and ratings) to be shared via a website, and create a value as a result (e.g. other people's opinions of a particular book that you want to buy). The term infoware was first used in O'Reilly's talk on the subject at the Linux Kongress in Würzburg in 1997, and later in talks such as one at ISPCON 98. It was written up and published as his chapter Hardware, Software, and Infoware in the book Open Sources: Voices from the Open Source Revolution.

The term Infoware was in fact coined much earlier in 1981 by Hugh Gillespie and registered in Canada in 1982 as the name of a Software development and consulting company focused on the delivery of simple information glue tools.

See also
 Web 2.0

External links
Hardware, Software, and Infoware chapter by Tim O'Reilly from Open Sources: Voices from the Open Source Revolution 
Question regarding O'Reilly's "infoware" talk at ISPCON 98
Applying Distributed XML to The Open Source Paradigm Shift by Steve Mallett

Websites